Erigeron abajoensis, the Abajo fleabane, is a species of Erigeron in the family Asteraceae. It is native to Utah in the western United States, and has been found also in neighboring parts of Arizona, Colorado, and New Mexico. It grows on sunny, dry, rocky slopes generally at elevations of 2,270 to 3,400 meters (7550–11350 feet).

Erigeron abajoensis is a short (5 to 25 cm or 2-10 inches tall) perennial plant. The leaves are narrowly oblanceolate (i.e. with a broad-rounded apex and a tapering base), set with stiff, straight bristles and located at the base of the stem. The flower heads are sometimes produced one at a time, sometimes in groups of 3 or 4. Each head contains as many as 60 blue or pink or white ray florets and many yellow disc florets,  all produced in the summer.

The species is named for the Abajo Mountains in southern Utah.

References

External links
United States Department of Agriculture plants profile

abajoensis
Flora of the Western United States
Plants described in 1947
Flora without expected TNC conservation status
Taxa named by Arthur Cronquist